Ashok Hall Girls' Residential School is a private girls' school located in Ranikhet, Almora District, India. The school was established in 1993 . The school provides education and residential facilities to students from classes 4 through 12.

Location

History

Ashok Hall Girls' Residential School was founded by industrialist Basant Kumar Birla and his wife Sarla Birla.

The school is ISO-9001:2000 and ISO-14001:2004 certified and it is currently pursuing TQM (Total Quality Management). The school is affiliated to the Council for Indian School Certificate Examinations, New Delhi.

Curriculum
It's a CISCE affiliated school. The subjects taught in the curriculum are English, Hindi, Bengali, Sanskrit, Mathematics, History, Civics, Geography, Economics, Physics, Chemistry, Biology, Political Science, Sociology, History, Computer Science and Health Education. The Senior Secondary Section (XI & XII) students are required to study one language and four elective subjects.

References

External links
 Official website
 Linked-In Profile

High schools and secondary schools in Uttarakhand
Girls' schools in Uttarakhand
Boarding schools in Uttarakhand
Almora district
Educational institutions established in 1993
1993 establishments in Uttar Pradesh